The 1984 Seiko Super Tennis Hong Kong, also known as the Hong Kong Open, was a men's tennis tournament played on indoor hard courts in Hong Kong that was part of the 1984 Grand Prix tennis circuit. It was the 12th edition of the event and was held from 22 October through 28 October 1984. First-seeded Andrés Gómez won the singles title.

Finals

Singles
 Andrés Gómez defeated  Tomáš Šmíd 6–3, 6–2
 It was Gómez' 5th singles title of the year and the 9th of his career.

Doubles
 Ken Flach /  Robert Seguso defeated  Mark Edmondson /  Paul McNamee 6–7, 6–3, 7–5

References

External links
 ITF tournament edition details

Viceroy Classic
1984 in Hong Kong
Tennis in Hong Kong